Natalia Zukerman (born June 25, 1975) is an American artist and musician. She blends genres of blues, jazz, bluegrass and folk.

Personal life
Zukerman was born in Manhattan, the daughter of violinist/violist/conductor Pinchas Zukerman and flutist/writer Eugenia Zukerman, and the sister of opera singer Arianna Zukerman.

In 1997 she earned a Bachelor of Arts in Visual Art at Oberlin College. Her senior thesis culminated in an exhibit of large-scale mixed media paintings.

She is openly lesbian.

Music and career
Zukerman's subject matter ranges from the whimsical to the metaphysical. Often she tells stories or relates personal observations about life and relationships, but her songs are not "confessional" in nature. Her vocal style reflects strong jazz influences.

Zukerman plays a variety of guitars including acoustic, electric, slide guitar, dobro, lap steel guitar and banjo, but primarily focuses on her Goodall acoustic guitar and vintage 1938 Rickenbacker lap steel guitar. Her guitar playing has been described as "fluid and smooth" while she has also been praised for her dexterity and nimble fingers.

Reflecting her varied musical roots, Zukerman cites Ma Rainey, Memphis Minnie, Bonnie Raitt, Erika Luckett, Joni Mitchell, Rickie Lee Jones and Ani DiFranco among her musical influences. Her first three albums were released on her own independent record label, Talisman Records. In 2008, she released her fourth album on Willy Porter's Weasel Records label.

Along with her work as singer, songwriter and guitarist, Zukerman is also an artist, specializing in large format drawings and murals.

Her 2011 studio album was Gas Station Roses. The album featured many guest appearances, including Patty Larkin, Garrison Starr, Meghan Toohey (The Weepies), Adrianne Gonzalez (The Rescues), Todd Sickafoose (Ani Difranco), and Ray Bonneville. It was first released in 2011, and early orders contained original paintings or prints of paintings by Zukerman.

Discography

Albums
2001 – Mortal Child
2003 – On A Clear Day
2006 – Only One
2008 – Brand New Frame
2011 – Gas Station Roses
2014 – Come Thief, Come Fire

Collaborations
Winterbloom: Winter Traditions (2009), with Antje Duvekot, Meg Hutchinson, and Anne Heaton.

References

External links
Murals

1975 births
Living people
American blues guitarists
American blues singer-songwriters
American women composers
20th-century American composers
American women singer-songwriters
American folk guitarists
American folk singers
American people of Israeli descent
Jewish American musicians
Lesbian Jews
American lesbian musicians
American LGBT singers
American LGBT songwriters
Lesbian singers
Lesbian songwriters
Lesbian composers
Oberlin College alumni
Singers from New York City
Jewish folk singers
20th-century American women guitarists
21st-century American women guitarists
Guitarists from New York City
20th-century women composers
20th-century American LGBT people
21st-century American LGBT people
21st-century American Jews
Singer-songwriters from New York (state)
American lesbian writers